Apaloderma is a genus of birds in the family Trogonidae.

The name is a compound word composed of two Greek words: hapalos, meaning "delicate"and derma, meaning "skin". Established by William John Swainson in 1833, the genus contains the following species:

References

 
Bird genera
 
Taxonomy articles created by Polbot
Taxa named by William John Swainson